The Counterterrorism Group, Inc. (CTG) is a subsidiary of the global intelligence, risk consulting, and security firm Paladin7 based in Washington, D.C. Specializing in intelligence analysis, and open-source intelligence, research, and counterterrorism operations.

Description
The company is an international intelligence firm that provides a variety of intelligence, and security services. CTG also provides the only virtual remote counterterrorism internship globally known to this date.

Publications
Of their publications, include the Counterterrorism National Intelligence Estimate (NIE), Security Briefs, Daily Terrorist Activity Reports, Threat Assessments, Travel Reports, and Analysis Intelligence Reports. CTG also produces specialty intelligence products, and other counterterrorism related intelligence.

References

Non-military counterterrorist organizations